Basiru Alhassan (born 29 April 2000) is a Ghanaian footballer who plays for Dibba Al Fujairah as a midfielder.

Career statistics

Club

Notes

References

External links

2000 births
Living people
Ghanaian footballers
Association football midfielders
UAE Pro League players
UAE First Division League players
Tudu Mighty Jets FC players
AC Sparta Prague players
Al-Wasl F.C. players
Dibba Al-Hisn Sports Club players
Al Hamriyah Club players
Hatta Club players
Dibba FC players
Expatriate footballers in the Czech Republic
Ghanaian expatriate sportspeople in the Czech Republic
Expatriate footballers in the United Arab Emirates
Ghanaian expatriate sportspeople in the United Arab Emirates